The 2015 American Ultimate Disc League season was the fourth season for the league. Each team played a 14-game schedule. The San Jose Spiders won the AUDL Championship over the Madison Radicals at Avaya Stadium in San Jose, California. The Spiders won the championship despite entering the final four with the lowest seed after a regular-season finish of 10-4.

Offseason
 The Ottawa Outlaws, the Los Angeles Aviators, the Atlanta Hustle, The Raleigh Flyers, the Jacksonville Cannons, the Charlotte Express, the Nashville Nightwatch, the Pittsburgh Thunderbirds, and the San Diego Growlers joined the league as the 18th, 19th, 20th, 21st, 22nd, 23rd, 24th, 25th, and 26th franchises.
 The Seattle Raptors changed their name to the Seattle Cascades
 The Salt Lake Lions went on hiatus

Regular Season Standings

East Division

Midwest Division

The Chicago Wildfire and Minnesota Wind Chill had one tie in a weather-shortened game.

West Division

South Division

 T indicates top seed in the playoffs. P indicates a team advanced to the playoffs. PD indicates point difference. The Jacksonville Cannons advanced to the playoffs because they won the head-to-head regular-season series with the Atlanta Hustle. Only two playoff spots were allocated to the newer and smaller South Division.

Playoffs

*Semifinal match-ups were determined by seeds based on regular season records.

All-AUDL Season Awards

First Team
Justin Allen, Raleigh Flyers
Tyler DeGirolamo, Pittsburgh Thunderbirds
Mischa Freystaetter, Jacksonville Cannons
Beau Kittredge, San Jose Spiders
Isaiah Masek-Kelly, Toronto Rush
Brett Matzuka, Chicago Wildfire
Jimmy Mickle, San Diego Growlers

Second Team
Kevin Underhill, Vancouver Riptide
Keenan Plew, Indianapolis AlleyCats
Andrew Meshnick, Madison Radicals
Marcelo Sanchez, San Jose Spiders
Derek Alexander, Ottawa Outlaws
Simon Higgins, San Jose Spiders
Yoland Cabot, Montreal Royal

Division Teams

East
Isaiah Masek-Kelly, Toronto Rush
Derek Alexander, Ottawa Outlaws
Ryan Drost, New York Empire
Jeff Lindquist, Toronto Rush
Yoland Cabot, Montreal Royal
Andrew Carroll, Toronto Rush
Kevin Groulx, Montreal Royal

Midwest
Tyler DeGirolamo, Pittsburgh Thunderbirds
Andrew Meshnick, Madison Radicals
Brett Matzuka, Chicago Wildfire
Jonathan Helton, Chicago Wildfire
Keenan Plew, Indianapolis AlleyCats
Andrew Brown, Madison Radicals
Ben Jagt, Minnesota Wind Chill

South
Mischa Freystaetter, Jacksonville Cannons 
Justin Allen, Raleigh Flyers
Matt Smith, Atlanta Hustle
Jarrett Bowen, Raleigh Flyers
Tom Radcliffe, Nashville NightWatch
Micah Hood, Charlotte Express
Paul Lally, Nashville NightWatch

West
Jimmy Mickle, San Diego Growlers
Beau Kittredge, San Jose Spiders
Matt Rehder, Seattle Cascades
Lucas Dallmann, San Francisco FlameThrowers
Gagan Chatha, Vancouver Riptide
Ashlin Joye, San Jose Spiders
Simon Higgins, San Jose Spiders

See also
UltiAnalytics AUDL team and player statistics

References

American Ultimate Disc League
2015 in American sports